Stig Carlsson is a retired Swedish footballer. Carlsson made 54 Allsvenskan appearances for Djurgården and scored 4 goals.

References

Swedish footballers
Djurgårdens IF Fotboll players
Association footballers not categorized by position
Living people
Year of birth missing (living people)
Place of birth missing (living people)